Fudbalski klub Radnički, commonly known as Radnički Niš, is a professional football club based in ok Niš, Serbia. Its name means Labourers in Serbian and stems from the relationship with the Labour movement which the club had during the first half of the 20th century.

Radnički Niš was one of the most stable clubs in the former Yugoslavia. The team spent a total of 29 seasons in the Yugoslav First League, achieved two 3rd-place finishes in 1980 and 1981, and one 3rd-place finish in 2018. In international competition, Radnički Niš won the 1975 Balkans Cup, reached the final in 1989, and played against Hamburger SV in the semi-finals of the UEFA Cup in 1982.

History

Beginnings (1923–1945) 

The club was founded on April 24, 1923, in the Kingdom of Serbs, Croats and Slovenes. One of its founders was the communist activist Miloš Marković (who also founded Sloboda Užice in 1925). In the same year, the club played its first unofficial matches. Two years later, in the 1925–26 season, the club became part of the professional league of the Morava Banovina, and won the championship on two occasions, in the 1924–25 and 1927–28 seasons. Following the proclamation of the royal dictatorship in 1929, the government began to persecute leftist activists, and Radnički changed its name to Građanski. As Građanski Niš, the club played in the 1935–36 Yugoslav Football Championship which was played in a straight-knockout competition format, and was eliminated in the round of sixteen by Građanski Skoplje. At the end of that season the club reinstated its original name, and played until 1941, when, because of the war, the club ceased its activities and its members and players joined the resistance.

At the beginning of World War II in the Kingdom of Yugoslavia in 1941, the club terminated the activities, which were renewed in 1945, one year after the liberation from the occupation of Nazi Germany.

The rise and stabilization (1962–1975) 
In 1962, Radnički Niš were promoted to the Yugoslav First League for the first time in the club's history. On 23 September 1962, Radnički fans displayed their first big choreography on the first league match against Red Star Belgrade. A large banner reading "Real sa Nišave", which translates to "Real from Nisava" was raised on the east stand, and the club bears this nickname to this day. The banner could be seen at every home game throughout the 1960s. In following years, the club underwent major development and became one of the most stable football clubs in the country. In 1963, the club founded its youth school, through which many of the Radnički players passed. In 1975, Radnički beat Turkish club Eskişehirspor (1–0, 2–1) and won its first trophy of European importance, the Balkans Cup.

The Golden Era (1980–1984) 
In 1980, Radnički finished the national championship in 3rd place, the best placement thus far, and played for the first time in the UEFA Cup in the following season, during which Radnički reached the round of sixteen, but lost against Dutch club AZ Alkmaar. In 1981, the club was again third and qualified for the 1981–82 UEFA Cup season. In the first round, Radnički Niš were drawn against Napoli. In the first leg, the club from South Serbia achieved a 2–2 draw in front of 70.000 spectators at Stadio San Paolo, which was enough for Radnički to progress after a goalless match in Serbia because of the away goals rule. After eliminating the Azzurri, Radnički played the second round against Grasshopper Club Zürich. The Swiss club won the first match in Zürich by 2–0, but Radnički had equalized with a 2–0 and won convincingly 3–0 in the penalty shoot-out. In the third round, the club played against Feyenoord from Rotterdam. In the first leg in Niš, the result was 2–0 for Radnički and at De Kuip the result was 1–0 for the Dutch club. However, it was a 2–1 victory on aggregate for the Serbian club and in the quarter-finals Radnički were drawn against Dundee United from Scotland. In the first leg, played in Dundee, Radnički suffered a 2–0 defeat. Although they were not seen as the favourites in the return leg, the Real from Nišava pulled off a convincing 3–0 win in front of its spectators, and with an aggregate score of 3–2 they eventually achieved their greatest success by reaching the semi-finals of this prestigious tournament. 

The semi-finals provided a football holiday at Čair Stadium, due to the fact that German top club Hamburger SV, led by stars like Horst Hrubesch, Felix Magath, Lars Bastrup, Manfred Kaltz, Thomas von Heesen and Uli Stein would play in Niš. In the first leg, Radnički Niš won against the favored North Germans in front of 38,500 enthusiastic Radnički fans with 2–1, but they lost the second leg in Hamburg by 5–1 (Hamburg lost at the end the final, but won next year the 1982–83 European Cup). After one year of absence from international football, the club qualified for the 1983–84 UEFA Cup season (finished the 1979–80 Yugoslav First League season in 4th place) and reached the round of sixteen, as in 1981. After winning matches against St Gallen (3–0, 2–1) and FK Inter Bratislava (4–0, 2–3), Radnički played against Hajduk Split. It was the first intra-Yugoslav fixture in UEFA cup. Hajduk won both matches 2–0 and progressed to the quarter-finals.

Radnički Niš played a total of 22 matches across Europe between 1981 and 1984. During this time, Radnički lost only one UEFA Cup home match of a total of 11 across three seasons and only against a team from the domestic league. A major contribution was made by the fans and their enthusiastic support. The Čair Stadium was a tough ground for the opposition and the atmosphere created by Radnički fans in a roaring stadium always gave hope to the team that they could overcome anybody.

Late Yugoslavia period/Serbia-Montenegro period (1985–2006) 
After the golden years, Radnički Niš was unexpectedly relegated to in the Yugoslav Second League in 1985, after 23 continuous years in the first league. However, under coach Josip Duvančić, Radnički won the Yugoslav Second League in the following season and returned to the first league after only a year of absence. In 1989, the club played its second Balkans Cup final after 1975, but they lost against OFI Crete of Greece by 3–1. At the beginning of the 1990s, the entire country was plunged into a crisis. The disintegration of Yugoslavia, the civil war (1992–95), the inflation and the UN sanctions hit all the Yugoslav football teams hard, and also Radnički was no exception. In the 2000–01 season, the club dropped out of the first division for the second time in its history. In the following season, Radnički Niš won the second division championship and quickly returned to the major clubs, but they ended the 2002–03 season in last place. After that, the club competed in the second league for the following five seasons.

Serbian SuperLiga 
In the 2008–09 season, Radnički was even relegated to Serbia's third division. They won the division, but they ended the 2009–10 Serbian First League season in the relegation zone. In the 2010–11 season, they won the Serbian League East and were promoted to the Serbian First League, Serbia's second division. What followed was a consecutive promotion. The club won the 2011-12 Serbian First League and was promoted to the Serbian SuperLiga, Serbia's highest football tier. In the same season, the club's home ground was rebuilt, which rekindled the fans' hopes further. Since then club become stable in Serbian SuperLiga gradually improving its position on the league table and establish itself as a major club in Serbian football once again. First season in highest division Radnički Niš finished in 12th place but kept improving every following season, finishing 6th, 9th and twice in 5th place. In season 2017–18 Serbian SuperLiga Radnički Niš finished in third place, which guaranteed them place in first qualifying round of UEFA Europa League. The following season marked the club's return to European competitions where they eliminated Maltese club Gzira United 5–0 on aggregate in the first qualifying round for the 2018-19 UEFA Europa League. Radnički was later eliminated in the second round by the favoured Israeli team Maccabi Tel Aviv 4–2 on aggregate. In the SuperLiga, Radnički finished the season in second place behind defending champions Red Star Belgrade, once again reaching the qualifying rounds for the UEFA Europa League.

Club colors and crest 
The club performed in a green-white jersey and on the left, in the white field, was a red five-pointed star as a symbol of affiliation with the Labour movement, the colour of which was later taken as a frequent kit color of Radnički. The club also used a blue and white kit, which was commonly seen during promotion play-offs and international fixtures, so the club bears all the colors of the Serbian flag. The crest is in the colors red and white, and bears the inscription of the year of foundation and the image of the Niš Fortress, which is a complex and important cultural and historical monument of the city of Niš.

Kit evolution

Stadium

The home ground of Radnički Niš is the Čair Stadium. It is named after the Čair neighbourhood in Medijana, the most populous municipality of Niš. The construction of the stadium was finished in 1963, and had a capacity of 40,000 spectators. After renovations between 2011 and 2012, the stadium capacity has been brought to 18,151 seats. The stadium is part of the Čair sports complex, which also includes the modern sporting arena Čair, a modern indoor swimming pool and other facilities. After the renovation of the swimming pool, the Čair Sports Center, and the complete reconstruction of the Čair stadium, Niš was endowed with a unique sports complex in Serbia and completed a full reconstruction of its sports infrastructure.

Reconstruction (2011-2012)

The Čair stadium began undergoing complete reconstruction during the second half of 2011 in an ambitious project by the Football Association of Serbia and the city of Niš. The project included the renovation of eastern, southern and northern stands. When reconstruction was finished, the stadium's seating capacity had been increased to 18,151 spectators, including an additional VIP lounge with 120 seats and a media lodge with 50 seats. The project also entailed covering the whole stadium, new floodlights and LED, a new locker room and press room, new infirmaries, a parking area, ticket offices, a restaurant and a TV room for broadcasts. After reconstruction, the stadium fulfilled the most up to date UEFA standards. The cost of the project was estimated to be over 1.1 billion Serbian dinars (10 million euros).

Debut game at the new stadium
Although it had not been completely finished, Čair Stadium was declared as a suitable venue for the second home match (first home match had to be played at Jagodina City Stadium against Radnički Kragujevac). However, the home opening match took place in the 5th round of Serbian SuperLiga against Smederevo 1924 on September 15, 2012. About 7,000 seats had been initially installed and they were completely filled as Radnički Niš has hosted its first SuperLiga match after 9 years. Manager Aleksandar Ilić fielded the following squad: Stevan Stefanović, Branislav Vukomanović, Milan Jovanović, Marko Ranđelović, Miloš Perić, Bratislav Pejčić, Aleksandar Jovanović, Dušan Kolarević, Miloš Petrović, Vladan Binić and Strahinja Petrović. Radnički supporters had to wait till the 84th minute when midfielder Dušan Kolarević scored via a 30-meter strike and brought Radnički Niš to a 1–0 win in the opening match.

Radnički's Ivan Krstić youth school
An important segment of the club is its youth school, which was founded in 1963, through which many of the Radnički players passed. The youth school is named after former Radnički's football player Ivan Krstić. He enrolled in Radnički's youth school at the age of and settled in the first team and became captain. At the threshold of a great football career, he lost his life during training as a result of a lightning strike on the auxiliary field, near the youth school. In memory of the tragically lost star player, the football schools bears his name to this day.

History
During 1963, one year after entry of Radnički in the Yugoslav First League, the club formed its own football schools at the initiative of Tihomir Petrović. Forty-eight players were selected from nine primary schools and began to learn the football alphabet at Radnički. It was a bright start to the football school tradition of Radnički which would eventually become a real talent pool, producing many football names that would spread the word about Niš, Yugoslav and Serbian football. The first greater success came in 1966, when they won a large tournament in Germany. In 1969, this was followed by winning a tournament in Paris, defeating the Italian team US Cagliari. More success followed and one of the highlights was the win at the international tournament "Vojvodina-Red Star", which was played in 1984 and which saw the participation of many national and international top youth teams. During the tournament, Radnički's youth was led by Milorad Janković, a former player of Radnički, who was honoured as the top youth coach by the Football Association of Yugoslavia. 1991 will be remembered as the year when Radnički's youth achieved their greatest success. For the first time, led by coach Vladislav Nikolić, they won the Yugoslav championship, after defeating Željezničar Sarajevo (1–0 at home by a goal from Dejan Petković, 1–1). In 1992, Radnički again fielded a national championship team in their series. Its cadets were Yugoslav champions and repeated the success achieved the previous year, which was a triumph for the managers of the youth school and coaches like Miroslav Glišović, Milorad Janković, Ljubiša Rajković and Miodrag Stefanović. In that period, Radnički's football school was well known for its youth work, which demonstrated a high level of technical skill, especially recognizable in young players such as Dragan Stojković and Dejan Petković, as well as tactical readiness in combination with adaptability. The last major success of the Radnički's football school was in 2000, when Radnički's cadets, led by coach Aleksandar Jovanovski, won the Serbian championship. In the final, they beat Red Star Belgrade by 1–0 and qualified for the final tournament for the Yugoslav championship. In the contest for the best cadet teams in the country, Radnički's young players achieved the 3rd place. In the same year, new sport facilities were opened which facilitated better working conditions. Today, the youth coaches are mostly former players of Radnički who are responsible for 400–450 young Radnički players and working according to the standards of major European football clubs.

Supporters

The first large organized support happened in 1962 against Vardar, when several thousand fans from Niš travelled to Skoplje. In 1962, Radnički Niš were promoted to the Yugoslav First League for the first time in their history and attracted more supporters from Niš and the surrounding region. Since Radnički's entry to the first division, Čair has always been a tough ground for the opposition. Although the club has had numerous supporters throughout the history, more organized groups emerged at the end of the 1980s. The name Meraklije was accepted, which roughly translates to "bohemian hedonists". The name has been synonymous with region customs for centuries.
Besides the football club, Meraklije also support other sport sections like handball, and the Serbian national handball team.

Club honours and achievements

Domestic
National Championships
 Serbian SuperLiga
Runners-up (1): 2018–19
 Yugoslav Second League
 Winner (1): 1985–86
 Serbian First League
 Winner (2): 2001–02, 2011–12
 Serbian League East
 Winner (2): 2008–09, 2010–11
 Niš Subassociation League
 Winner (3): 1933, 1934, 1936 (all as Građanski Niš)

International
 UEFA Cup:
 Semi-Finalist (1): 1981–82
 Balkans Cup:
 Winners (1): 1975
 Runners-up (1): 1988–89

Individual awards
Serbian First League top scorers

Serbian SuperLiga top scorers

Radnički Niš totals by league rank and highest achievements

Radnički Niš in Europe

Players

Current squad

Out on loan

Retired number(s)

  Ivan "Beli" Krstić, midfielder (−2000) – posthumous honour.

Since 2000, Radnički Niš have not issued the squad number 10. It was retired in memory of Ivan Krstić, who was killed by lightning on 29 May 2000 on the training match. His son will be able to wear number 10 in the future.

Club officials
As of July 26, 2022

Technical staff

Management

Notable players
For the list of current and former Radnički Niš footballers with Wikipedia article, please see :Category:FK Radnički Niš players.

To appear in this section a player must have either:
 Played at least 80 games for the club.
 Set a club record or won an individual award while at the club.
 Played at least one international match for their national team at any time.

  Aleksandar Jovanović (1985)
  Aleksandar Jovanović (1992)
  Ivan Pejčić
  Miloš Petrović
  Marko Ranđelović
  Saša Stojanović
  Nemanja Tomić
  Petar Đuričković
  Saša Marjanović
  Zoran Vasković
  Igor Stefanović
  Ivan Krstić
  Borislav Stevanović
  Aleksandar Živković
  Jovan Anđelković
  Slobodan Antić
  Zoran Banković
  Samid Beganović
  Dragiša Binić
  Zoran Bojović
  Nenad Cvetković
  Vitomir Dimitrijević
  Ilija Dimoski
  Branislav Đorđević
  Miloš Drizić
  Goran Gavrilović
  Stojan Gavrilović
  Slobodan Halilović
  Dragan Holcer
  Nenad Jakšić
  Milorad Janković
  Blagoja Kitanovski
  Blagoja Kuleski
  Aleksandar Kuzmanović
  Zoran Milenković
  Zoran Milinković
  Dušan Mitošević
  Srđan Mladenović
  Slavoljub Nikolić
  Milovan Obradović
  Stevan Ostojić
  Aleksandar Panajotović
  Dragan Pantelić
  Dejan Petković
  Rade Radisavljević
  Dragan Radosavljević
  Ljubiša Rajković
  Miroslav Simonović
  Goran Stojiljković
  Miodrag Stojiljković
  Dragan Stojković
  Miroslav Vardić
  Goran Vasilijević
  Josip Višnjić
  Miroslav Vojinović
  Milan Ivanović
  Nermin Haskić
  Aleksandar Kosorić
  Bojan Letić 
  Jovo Mišeljić
  Metodi Tomanov
  Milan Borjan
  Siniša Gogić
  Vladan Tomić
  Rebin Sulaka
  Bauyrzhan Turysbek
  Anton Zemlianukhin
  Aleksandar Bajevski
  Vlade Lazarevski
  Ljubodrag Milošević
  Todor Todoroski
  Darko Bulatović
  Nikola Drinčić
  Petar Grbić
  Milan Jovanović
  Damir Kojašević
  Vladimir Volkov
  Erik Jirka

Coaching history

This is the list of first team coaches of Radnički Niš:

 Aleksandar Atanacković (1954–55)
 Dimitrije Guburevac (1955–59)
 Miodrag Petrović (1959–60)
 Janko Zvekanović (1960–61)
 Miroslav Glišović (1962–63)
 Abdulah Gegić (July 1, 1963 – June 30, 1964)
 Dušan Nenković (1964–65)
 Dragoljub Milošević (1965–66)
 Miroslav Glišović (1966–67)
 Ratomir Čabrić (1967–68)
 Miroslav Glišović (1968–69)
 Slavko Videnović (1970–71)
 Dušan Varagić (1971–72)
 Miroslav Glišović (1972–74)
 Đorđe Kačunković (1974–76)
 Miroslav Glišović (1976–77)
 Josip Duvančić (1977–79)
 Dušan Nenković (1979–82)
 Ilija Dimoski (1982–83)
 Miroslav Glišović (1984)
 Dušan Nenković (1985)
 Milorad Janković (1985)
 Josip Duvančić (1985–86)
 Zoran Čolaković (1986–87)
 Milan Živadinović (1987–88)
 Slobodan Halilović (July 1, 1988–89)
 Dragan Pantelić (1989–90)
 Slobodan Halilović (1990–92)
 Nenad Cvetković (1992)
 Vladislav Nikolić (1992–93)
 Ljuborad Stevanović (1993)
 Milovan Đorić (1993)
 Milorad Janković (1993)
 Zoran Banković (1993–94)
 Vladimir Milosavljević (1994)
 Miodrag Stefanović (1994)
 Josip Duvančić (1994–96)
 Slobodan Halilović (1996–97)
 Miodrag Stefanović (1997)
 Mile Tomić (1997)
 Miodrag Stojiljković (1997)
 Vladislav Nikolić (1997–98)
 Miodrag Ješić (1998)
 Boško Antić (1998)
 Ilija Dimoski (1998–99)
 Radmilo Ivančević (1999)
 Boris Bunjak (1999)
 Zoran Čolaković (1999–00)
 Jovica Škoro (2000)
 Zoran Milenković (2001)
 Tomislav Manojlović (2002)
 Boban Krstić (2002)
 Zoran Milenković (2003)
 Vladimir Jocić (2006)
 Milenko Kiković (2006)
 Slobodan Antonijević (2007–08)
 Vladislav Đukić (2008–09)
 Miodrag Stefanović (2009)
 Slavoljub Janković (2009)
 Aleksandar Ilić (2009–10)
 Aleksandar Kuzmanović (2010)
 Dragan Ilić (2011)
 Zvonko Đorđević (2011)
 Aleksandar Kuzmanović (2011–12)
 Aleksandar Ilić (March 26, 2012 – Feb 23, 2013)
 Saša Mrkić (Feb 23, 2013 – May 13, 2013)
 Dragoljub Bekvalac (July 1, 2013 – March 11, 2014)
 Milan Milanović (March 18, 2014 – June 24, 2014)
 Dragoslav Stepanović (July 7, 2014 – Sept 5, 2014)
 Saša Mrkić (Sept 8, 2014 – Dec 4, 2014)
 Milan Rastavac (Dec 30, 2014 – May 19, 2017)
 Peter Pacult (June 12, 2017 – August 4, 2017)
 Ivan Jević (August 7, 2017 – October 19, 2017)
 Milan Đuričić (October 21, 2017 – January 1, 2018)
 Boban Dmitrović (January 5, 2018 – March 17, 2018)
 Dragan Antić (March 20, 2018 – Jun 1, 2018)
 Nenad Lalatović (Jun 1, 2018 – June 21, 2019)
 Simo Krunić (Jun 25, 2019 – August 20, 2019)
 Milorad Kosanović (August 20, 2019 – February 22, 2020)
 Radoslav Batak (25 February, 2020 – 6 October, 2020)
 Milan Đuričić (6 October, 2020-26 November, 2020)
 Vladimir Gaćinović (27 November, 2020—12 April, 2021)
 Aleksandar Stanković (12 April, 2021—7 June, 2021)
 Nenad Lalatović (7 June, 2021—24 June, 2021)
 Aleksandar Stanković (26 June, 2021—24 August,2021)
 Radomir Koković (1 September, 2021—21 September, 2021)

Kit manufacturers and shirt sponsors

References

External links

 Official website 
  
 Meraklije (supporter's website) 

 
Football clubs in Serbia
Football clubs in Yugoslavia
Association football clubs established in 1923
Sport in Niš
1923 establishments in Serbia